Kingsmere is a community in Chelsea, Les Collines-de-l'Outaouais Regional County Municipality, Outaouais, Quebec, Canada. It is within Gatineau Park and in the National Capital Region, near the capital Ottawa, Ontario.

The Farm, the official residence of the Speaker of the House of Commons of Canada, is located in the community, as are Mackenzie King Estate and Kingsmere Lake.

References

Communities in Outaouais
National Capital Region (Canada)